The Philolexian Society of Columbia University is one of the oldest college literary and debate societies in the United States, and the oldest student group at Columbia. Founded in 1802, the Society aims to "improve its members in Oratory, Composition and Forensic Discussion." The name Philolexia is Greek for "love of discourse," and the society's motto is the Latin word Surgam, meaning "I shall rise." The society traces its roots to a literary society founded by Alexander Hamilton in the 1770s.

Philolexian (known to members as "Philo," pronounced with a long "i") has been called the "oldest thing at Columbia except the College itself," and it has been an integral part of Columbia from the beginning, providing the institution with everything from its colors, Philolexian Blue (along with White, from her long-dispatched rival Peithologian Society), to some of its most solemn traditions and many of its most noted graduates. Members are admitted after a highly selective evaluation process and are sworn to secrecy thereafter.

Historical background
Philolexian is one of many literary societies that flourished at the nation's early colonial colleges. Before fraternities, publications, and other extracurriculars became common, these groups—which generally bore Greek or Latin names—were the sole source of undergraduate social life. Indeed, it was not unusual for two or more groups to coexist at one institution, often in competition. Surviving examples include the Porcellian Club and Institute of 1770 of Harvard University; Crotonia Society, Linonian Society, Calliopean Society, and Brothers in Unity of Yale University; Philomathean Society of University of Pennsylvania,  Philodemic Society of Georgetown University, Union-Philanthropic Literary Society at Hampden-Sydney College, the Dialectic and Philanthropic Societies at the University of North Carolina at Chapel Hill, Jefferson Literary and Debating Society at the University of Virginia and the Whig–Cliosophic Society at Princeton University. Yale University also has a number of student literary and political societies with similar purposes (though without the Greek names), the most notable being the Elizabethan Club and the Yale Political Union.

Founding
Columbia's first such society was formed in the 1770s, when the school was still known as King's College; among this unnamed organization's members was future Treasury Secretary Alexander Hamilton (Class of 1778) and his roommate Robert Troup. After the Revolution, a similar group known as the Columbia College Society for Progress in Letters was formed; among its members were John P. Van Ness (Class of 1789), later mayor of Washington, D.C., and Daniel D. Tompkins (Class of 1795), vice president of the United States under James Monroe. The group became extinct in 1795.

Building on these earlier efforts, Philolexian was established on May 17, 1802. Among its earliest members were future Columbia president Nathaniel Fish Moore (Class of 1802), and Alexander Hamilton's son, James Alexander Hamilton (Class of 1805), U.S. Attorney for the Southern District of New York. To accommodate freshmen, who were initially ineligible for admission, the Peithologian Society was formed four years later. For most of the next 100 years, Peithologian would serve as Philolexian's primary literary rival.

For most of the 19th century, Philo engaged in a wide range of literary activities, including debates within and without the society, essay writing, correspondence, and hosting speeches by eminent men of the city. In 1852, at the organization's semi-centennial celebration, alumni raised a prize fund of over $1,300 to endow annual awards in three categories: Oratory, Debate, and Essay. (The awards were eventually combined into a general "Philolexian Prize" which, since the 1950s, has been awarded annually by Columbia University's English department.)

20th century
In the 20th century, Philo broadened its range of activities as it became a training ground for essayist Randolph Bourne (Class of 1912), poet A. Joyce Kilmer (Class of 1908), and statesman V.K. Wellington Koo (Class of 1909), all prize winners in their time at Philo. In 1910 the society took a decidedly dramatic turn when it commenced a 20-year stretch of annual theatre productions, ranging from Elizabethan comedies to contemporary works. Many of the older productions, by the likes of Ben Jonson, Nicholas Udall, and Robert Greene, were North American debuts. Oscar-winning screenwriter Sidney Buchman (Mr. Smith Goes to Washington, Here Comes Mr. Jordan, Cleopatra) (Class of 1923) got a start playing Shakespeare's Richard II for a Philo production.

Although Philolexian members during the Great Depression included such figures as future Pulitzer Prize-winning poet John Berryman and publisher Robert Giroux (both Class of 1936) and noted Trappist monk and humanist Thomas Merton (Class of 1938), the economic hardships of the period severely curtailed the group's activities. By the late 1930s, according to former society president Ralph de Toledano (Class of 1938), the organization was devoted mainly to drinking wine and listening to jazz. Philo effectively ceased to function by the beginning of World War II.

Decline and renewal
But in 1943, at the behest of Columbia history professor and former Philo president Jacques Barzun (Class of 1927), several undergraduates competed for the Philolexian Centennial Washington Prize, an oratory competition endowed by J. Ackerman Coles (Class of 1864), bestowed on the society on the occasion of its centennial in 1902. This short-lived revival was followed by another wartime incarnation. By 1952, due to waning interest and, according to some, the infamous presidency of poet Allen Ginsberg (Class of 1948), the society entered a 10-year period of dormancy. Another brief revival in 1962, spearheaded by members of the Columbia chapter of Alpha Delta Phi, was followed by an even longer period of inactivity.

On Wednesday, October 16, 1985, under the guidance of Thomas Vinciguerra (Class of 1985), the society was revived in its current incarnation. Mr. Vinciguerra was subsequently recognized as the society's "Avatar" in honor of this and other critical and successful efforts for Philo. In 2003, an award in his name was established.

On Saturday, October 16, 2010, the society celebrated the 25th anniversary of its revival with a reception and meeting for students, alumni (known as "Geezers"), and various supporters; the occasion was dubbed "Resurgam 25." The debate topic, "Resolved: The Philolexian Society Has Never Had It So Good" was overwhelmingly approved.

Current organization
The Philolexian Society holds meetings every Thursday the university is in session; the agenda typically consists of a debate and the presentation of a literary work. It also hosts a Croquet Tea, the Annual Joyce Kilmer Memorial Bad Poetry Contest
 (which has received coverage in the New York Times) (the winner of which becomes the Poet Laureate of the society until the next Contest), a beat poetry event appropriately called Beat Night, and a Greek-style symposium. The organization also publishes a collection of poetry, prose, and visual media called "Surgam". "Surgam" published three issues per year: Fall and Spring, which contain traditional works of literature and arts, and Winter, which compiles the best entries from the Joyce Kilmer Memorial Bad Poetry Contest. "Surgam" is published both in print, and available free of charge at Philolexian Society debates, and online, through the Surgam website. Starting in 2003, Philolexian has organized a fund for small theatre projects, later named for Robert C. Schnitzer (Class of 1927), and sponsored an improv comedy group called Klaritin.

In 2003 the society held a constitutional convention that updated the original document, adjusting the organization to suit changes that had happened in the previous 200 years, such as co-education. Nonetheless, the society has retained its traditional forms and rituals almost in their entirety. Philolexian has several officers, the Moderator (de facto president), Scriba, and Censor (emeritus president), as well as other enviable positions, including Herald, Keeper of the Halls, Chancellor of the Exchequer, Sergeant-at-Arms, Whip, Minister of Internet Truth, Nomenclaturist-General, Symposiarch, and Literary Czar, editor of the literary journal of the Society.

The number of Philolexians is unknown. Those who wish to gain full membership within the society must speak at three consecutive meetings and attend regularly. Those candidates who qualify may receive an invitation to New Member Night, a secretive initiation rite. A petition for membership and a work of original, creative merit must be provided by the candidate. This meeting is not open to the public. Members have access to a large number of privileges through the organization.

Notable Philolexians
In addition to the names cited above, prominent Philolexians have included:

 Episcopal Bishop of Pennsylvania Henry Ustick Onderdonk (Class of 1805);
 U.S. Congressman Edmund H. Pendleton (Class of 1805);
 War of 1812 veteran Lt. Col. John Chrystie, namesake of Chrystie Street in Manhattan (Class of 1806);
 New Jersey Governor Peter Dumont Vroom (Class of 1808);
 Theologian Jackson Kemper (Class of 1809);
 Episcopal Bishop of New York Benjamin Treadwell Onderdonk (Class of 1809);
 Financier William Backhouse Astor, Sr. (Class of 1811);
 Congressman Charles G. Ferris (Class of 1811);
 Maj. Gen. Stephen Watts Kearny (Class of 1812);
 Classical scholar Charles Anthon (Class of 1815);
 District attorney for Southern New York James I. Roosevelt, granduncle of Theodore Roosevelt (Class of 1815);
 New-York Historical Society President Frederic de Peyster (Class of 1816);
 Acting Governor of Rhode Island and vice president of the New-York Historical Society William Beach Lawrence (Class of 1818);
 Bibliophile and New York Public Library co-founder James Lenox (Class of 1818), namesake of Lenox Avenue;
 Explorer John Lloyd Stephens (Class of 1822);
 Railroad engineer Horatio Allen (Class of 1823);
 Preacher George Washington Bethune (Class of 1823);
 United States Secretary of State Hamilton Fish (Class of 1827);
 Journalist John L. O'Sullivan (Class of 1831), coiner of the phrase "Manifest Destiny";
 Lobbyist Samuel Cutler Ward (Class of 1831);
 Literary critic Evert Augustus Duyckinck (Class of 1835);
 Associate Justice of the Supreme Court of the United States Samuel Blatchford (Class of 1837);
 Diarist and U.S. Sanitary Commission treasurer George Templeton Strong (Class of 1838);
 Sportsman William R. Travers (Class of 1838), namesake of the Travers Stakes;
 Chemist Oliver Wolcott Gibbs (Class of 1841), president of the National Academy of Sciences;
 Lafayette College president James Hall Mason Knox (Class of 1841;
 Mayor of New York City Abram S. Hewitt (Class of 1842);
 Frederick Samuel Tallmadge (Class of 1845), whose funding made possible the purchase of Fraunces Tavern by the Sons of the Revolution;
 Cornelius Rea Agnew (Class of 1849), medical director of the New York Volunteer Hospital;
 Financier William Backhouse Astor, Jr. (Class of 1849);
 Social reformer Elbridge Thomas Gerry (Class of 1857), founder of the New York Society for the Prevention of Cruelty to Children;
 Military theorist Alfred Thayer Mahan (Class of 1858);
 Real estate developer Robert Goelet (Class of 1860);
 Columbia College Dean John Howard Van Amringe (Class of 1860);
 Novelist Edgar Fawcett (Class of 1867);
 Diplomat Nicholas Fish II (Class of 1867);
 Muckraker Henry Demarest Lloyd (Class of 1867);
 Assistant Secretary of State and Columbia trustees chairman George Lockhart Rives (Class of 1868);
 Historian William Milligan Sloane (Class of 1868);
 Speaker of the New York State Assembly and U.S. Congressman Hamilton Fish II (Class of 1869);
 Journalist and social reformer William Dudley Foulke (Class of 1869);
 Willard Bartlett (Class of 1869), Chief Judge of the New York Court of Appeals;
 Illinois Central Railroad president Stuyvesant Fish (Class of 1871);
 Dramatic scholar Brander Matthews (Class of 1871);
 Music critic Gustav Kobbé (Class of 1877);
 New York City subway chief engineer William Barclay Parsons (Class of 1879);
 William Fellowes Morgan, Sr. (Class of 1880), president of the National Society for the Prevention of Blindness;
 John Armstrong Chaloner (Class of 1883), madman;
 U.S. Congressman and Assistant Secretary of War J. Mayhew Wainwright (Class of 1884);
 U.S. Ambassador to Germany James W. Gerard (Class of 1890);
 Pioneering anthropologist Alfred L. Kroeber (Class of 1896);
 Mayor of New York City John Purroy Mitchel (Class of 1899);
 United States Attorney for the Southern District of New York Charles H. Tuttle (Class of 1899), Republican nominee for Governor of New York;
 New York Times editor and "Topics of the Times" essayist Simeon Strunsky (Class of 1900);
 Playwright George Middleton (Class of 1902), president of the Dramatists Guild of America;
 Publisher Alfred Harcourt (Class of 1904), co-founder of Harcourt Brace;
 Shoe manufacturer Ward Melville (Class of 1909);
 Governor of North Dakota and U.S. Senator William Langer (Class of 1910);
 Union College president Dixon Ryan Fox (Class of 1911);
 Essayist and critic Randolph Bourne (Class of 1912);
 American Political Science Association president Arthur MacMahon (Class of 1912);
 Political scientist Parker Thomas Moon (Class of 1913);
 Lawyer and publisher Douglas Black (Class of 1916), president of Doubleday and Company, 1946–1963;
 Congressman Frederic René Coudert, Jr. (Class of 1918);
 Philosopher John Herman Randall, Jr. (Class of 1918);
 Western writer James Warner Bellah (Class of 1923);
 Oscar-winning screenwriter Sidney Buchman (Class of 1923);
 Humorist Corey Ford (Class of 1923);
 Writer Henry Morton Robinson (Class of 1923), author of The Cardinal and co-author of A Skeleton Key to Finnegans Wake;
 Astrologer Gavin Arthur (Class of 1924), grandson of President Chester A. Arthur;
David Cort (Class of 1924), foreign news editor of Life magazine;
 New York State Superintendent of Banks and BusinessWeek publisher Elliott V. Bell (Class of 1925);
 Pioneering James Joyce scholar William York Tindall (Class of 1925):
 Philanthropist Lawrence Wien (Class of 1925);
 Science fiction anthologist Groff Conklin (Class of 1927);
 Oscar-winning screenwriter William Ludwig (Class of 1932);
 City College of New York president Robert Marshak (Class of 1936), president of the American Physical Society;
 Robert Paul Smith (1936), author of Where Did You Go? Out. What Did You Do? Nothing and co-author of The Tender Trap;
 John La Touche (Class of 1937), lyricist for Cabin in the Sky and The Golden Apple;
 Conservative author Ralph de Toledano (Class of 1938);
 Minimalist poet Robert Lax (Class of 1938);
 Spiritual writer Thomas Merton (Class of 1938);
 English professor, and jazz and religion scholar Barry Ulanov (Class of 1939);
 Author Ed Rice (Class of 1940);
 Dalton School headmaster Donald Barr (Class of 1941);
 East Asian scholar and Columbia University provost Wm. Theodore de Bary (Class of 1941);
 Oscar-winning screenwriter I.A.L. Diamond (Class of 1941);
Holocaust author Gerald Green (Class of 1942);
 Economist Robert Lekachman (Class of 1942);
 East Asian scholar Philip Yampolsky (Class of 1942);
 New York Giants quarterback Paul Governali (Class of 1943);
 Grammy-winning record producer Orrin Keepnews (Class of 1943);
 Novelist Walter Wager (Class of 1944);
 Beat Generation icon and United Press International editor Lucien Carr (Class of 1946);
 Arthur Lazarus, Jr., American Indian rights lawyer (Class of 1946);
 Magazine editor Byron Dobell, mentor of New Journalism pioneer Tom Wolfe (Class of 1947);
 Victorino Tejera, philosopher (Class of 1948);
 Pulitzer Prize-winning gerontologist Robert Neil Butler (Class of 1949);
 Publisher Jason Epstein (Class of 1949);
 Poet John Hollander (Class of 1950);
 Physician/scientist/essayist Gerald Weissmann (Class of 1950);
 Columbia College Dean Carl Hovde (Class of 1950);
 Pulitzer Prize-winning poet and translator Richard Howard (Class of 1951);
 Editor Robert Gottlieb (Class of 1952);
 Literary scholar Jeffrey Hart (Class of 1952);
 Television writer Art Eisenson (Class of 1963);
 Historian Howard Spodek (Class of 1963);
 Rheumatologist and pioneering investigator of Lyme disease Allen Steere (1965);
 Actor Ben Stein (Class of 1966);
 Historian of science Mott T. Greene (Class of 1967);
 Novelist and Academy Award-winning film producer Garth Stein (Class of 1987);
 Judge of the U.S. Court of Appeals for the Third Circuit Stephanos Bibas (Class of 1989);
 Lesbian writer and poet Carol Guess (Class of 1990);
New York Times Style reporter Alex Kuczynski (Barnard College Class of 1990);
 Entrepreneur Jack Hidary (Class of 1991), co-founder of the Auto X Prize;
 Writer, legal scholar and LGBT activist Jay Michaelson (Class of 1993);
 MTV personality Gideon Yago (Class of 2000);
 Children's book author Kyle Lukoff (Barnard College Class of 2006).

Awards and accomplishments
Philolexians have:
Won:
 Four Academy Awards
 Three Pulitzer Prizes
 Two Grammy Awards
 One Emmy Award
Included:
 Eight United States Representatives
 Eight college presidents
 Five United States ambassadors
 Four governors
 Two United States Senators
 Two Mayors of New York City
 One Associate Justice of the Supreme Court of the United States
Founded or co-founded:
 The Travers Stakes
 Harcourt Brace
 Thom McAn Shoes
 The New York Review of Books
 Library of America
 Writers Guild of America
 The Century Association
 Players' Club
Been president of:
 New-York Historical Society
 New York Chamber of Commerce
 New York Athletic Club
 National Academy of Sciences
 Doubleday
 Authors' League of America
 American Physical Society
 American Mathematical Society
 American Anthropological Association
 The American Jewish Committee
 American Historical Association
 American Society of Civil Engineers
 American Academy of Arts and Letters
 Association for Asian Studies
 The Union League Club of New York

References
Barzun, Jacques (editor): "Samplings and Chronicles, Being the Continuation of the Philolexian Society History, With Literary Selections, From 1912 to 1927," New York, published by the Society, 1927
Bellah, James Warner: "When the College Was Younger and, Perhaps, More Literary," New York, Columbia College Today, Spring 1962
Cardozo, Ernest A.: "A History of the Philolexian Society of Columbia University From 1802-1902," New York, published by the Society, 1902
Swindler, Josie. "Debate Club's Debauchery Continues in 21st Century" Columbia Spectator. (October 27, 2005)
Vinciguerra, Thomas J.: "Contemporary Civilization Meets Monty Python," New York, Columbia College Today, Spring/Summer 1987
"Philolexian Annals 1902-1912 With the Constitution and By-Laws," New York, published by the Society, 1912
"The Columbian" (yearbook): New York, Columbia University, various years

Inline references

External links
The Philolexian Society of Columbia University
The Philolexian Foundation
Columbia University
1987 New York Times Article on Joyce Kilmer Bad Poetry Contest

Columbia University student organizations
Student societies in the United States
Student debating societies
College literary societies in the United States
1802 establishments in New York (state)
Organizations established in 1802